Sylvie Ngouadakpa is a nurse and university lecturer from the Central African Republic. She is the first woman from the Central African Republic to be awarded the Florence Nightingale Medal.

Biography 
In 2011 Ngouadakpa became the first woman from the Central African Republic to be awarded the Florence Nightingale Medal. In her acceptance speech she dedicated the award to all the nurses of the CAR. She is Director of the University Institute of Paramedical Training (IUMP), based at the Central African Red Cross in collaboration with the University of Bangui. She was previously head of the Association of Nurses of Midwives of the Central African Republic (ANISCA).

Ngouadakpa is married and has seven children.

References 

Living people
Year of birth missing (living people)
Central African Republic women
Florence Nightingale Medal recipients
Paramedics
Midwives
Academic staff of the University of Bangui